The 2020–21 Big 12 men's basketball season began with practices in October 2020, followed by the start of the 2020–21 NCAA Division I men's basketball season in November. Regular season conference play began in December 2020 and concluded in March 2021. The Big 12 tournament was held from March 11–14, 2021 and was played at the T-Mobile Center in Kansas City, Missouri. Baylor won their first ever National Championship, becoming the first Big 12 team to win the National Championship since Kansas in 2008.

Coaches

Coaching changes 
There were no head coaching changes following the 2019–20 Big 12 Conference men's basketball season.

Head coaches 
Note: Stats are through the beginning of the season. All stats and records are from time at current school only.

Preseason

Recruiting classes

Preseason watchlists
Below is a table of notable preseason watch lists. 

Big 12 Preseason Poll

Pre-Season All-Big 12 Team

Player of the Year: Jared Butler, Baylor
Newcomer of the Year: Marcus Santos-Silva, Texas Tech
Freshman of the Year: Cade Cunningham, Oklahoma State

Preseason national polls

Rankings

Regular season

Conference matrix

Big 12/SEC Challenge

Postseason

Big 12 tournament

NCAA tournament

Honors and awards

All-Americans

To earn "consensus" status, a player must win honors from a majority of the following teams: the 
Associated Press, the USBWA, Sporting News, and the National Association of Basketball Coaches.

All-Big 12 awards and teams

Notes

References